Margaret Louise Ebey (born October 12, 1935), known professionally as Margie Singleton, is an American country music singer and songwriter. In the 1960s, she was a popular duet and solo recording artist, working with country stars George Jones and Faron Young. Singleton had her biggest hit with Young called "Keeping Up with the Joneses" in 1964. She managed a successful solo career in the 1960s.

Biography

Early life and rise to fame
She was born in Coushatta, Louisiana, United States. As a young child, she was influenced by blues and gospel music. In 1949, at the age of 13, she married Shelby Singleton. They worked at a munitions plant near Shreveport, Louisiana during the Korean War. She began to play guitar and write songs as a teenager after the birth of her first child, Stephen Singleton, in 1950. She had her second son, Sidney Singleton, in 1955.

In 1957, she signed with Starday Records, and released her first single that same year called "One Step (Nearer To You)". The flip side of the single was called "Not What He's Got". Both of these songs were self-penned. In 1958, she made her radio and professional debut on Louisiana Hayride. That same year, she released other 2 singles  "Nothing But True Love" and "Teddy" with a great b-side, the outstanding rockabilly "oo-wee (you're the one for me)all penned by Her and Shelby Singleton. "Nothing but true love" was more successful, becoming a minor hit on the country music chart, reaching the top 25. She regularly appeared on Louisiana Hayride before moving to Jubilee USA in 1960.

Height of career in 1960s
Singleton released another single in 1959 called "Eyes of Love". The song gave Singleton her first major hit when it reached the Top 20 in 1960. In 1961, she switched to Mercury Records where her husband Shelby Singleton was a producer. With his help, Singleton recorded a duet with George Jones called "Did I Ever Tell You". The song became another hit for Singleton, and was released in 1961. The following year, the duo had equal success together with another country hit called "Waltz of the Angels".

Singleton continued to be an avid songwriter. She wrote a pop music hit for Brook Benton called "Lie to Me". In 1963, he had another pop hit with another song written by Singleton called "My True Confession". The year 1963 was also the year Singleton made her debut on country music's most coveted show, the Grand Ole Opry; and had another hit with the song "Old Records". In addition to being a solo and duet star, she also sang as a back-up vocalist with The Jordanaires. Numerous performers recorded many of her songs, including Teresa Brewer, Tammy Wynette and Charley Pride. In 1964, Singleton teamed up with singer Faron Young. Together they recorded the song "Keeping Up with the Joneses". That year, the song reached the country top 5, and became Singleton's biggest hit. The flip side of the single, "No Thanks, I Just Had One", was a Top 40 country hit. They continued to release singles and record together.

By 1965, Singleton was divorced from Shelby Singleton. That same year, she married Leon Ashley, and soon moved to United Artists Records. In 1967, she moved to her husband's label, Ashley Records. That year, she recorded a cover version of the Bobbie Gentry hit song "Ode to Billie Joe", which reached the country Top 40. She had a Top 60 duet with her husband called "Hangin' On" in 1968. That same year, she appeared in a movie with Marty Robbins called Road to Nashville. Her chart success was fading rapidly, although she continued to record, including recording the first version of "Harper Valley PTA" that was later a huge crossover hit by Jeannie C. Riley.

Later career
Singleton continued to record for her husband's label, but with no further chart entries. She toured with her husband Leon with the Country Music Spectacular, and with his band, Strings of Nashville. He died in 2014. Singleton returned to the studio recording a new gospel CD as well as revisiting yesterday and re-recording some of her past hits and favorites. She continues to play dates and enjoys writing. She has recorded and released a video for her self-penned song, "Heaven or Hell" (2018).

Discography

Albums

Singles

A"Magic Star" peaked at number 24 on the Bubbling Under Hot 100 Singles chart.

References

External links
 Margie Singleton At LP Discography.com
 Margie Singleton At Hillbilly-Music.com
 [ Margie Singleton At Allmusic]

1935 births
Singleton, Magie
American women country singers
American country singer-songwriters
People from Coushatta, Louisiana
Starday Records artists
Singer-songwriters from Louisiana
Country musicians from Louisiana
21st-century American women